Dunedin South is a former New Zealand parliamentary electorate. It first existed from 1881 to 1890, and subsequently from 1905 to 1946. In 1996, the electorate was re-established for the introduction of MMP, before being abolished in 2020.

Population centres
The previous electoral redistribution was undertaken in 1875 for the 1875–1876 election. In the six years since, New Zealand's European population had increased by 65%. In the 1881 electoral redistribution, the House of Representatives increased the number of European representatives to 91 (up from 84 since the 1875–76 election). The number of Māori electorates was held at four. The House further decided that electorates should not have more than one representative, which led to 35 new electorates being formed, including Dunedin South, and two electorates that had previously been abolished to be recreated. This necessitated a major disruption to existing boundaries.

As the name suggests, the electorate was based on the southern suburbs of Dunedin. It stretched out westwards to take in towns on the Taieri Plains such as Mosgiel, Green Island and Fairfield. The Otago Peninsula was also in the electorate.

The most recent Dunedin South electorate was created in 1996 as one of the original 65 MMP electorates, as a merger between St Kilda and a large part of Dunedin West. Until the 2008 election, it was enlarged at every electoral boundary review, but in the 2013 review, its boundaries were kept. Middlemarch was first included in the electorate for the 2008 election; other localities include:

 Southern Dunedin (48,000)
 Mosgiel (13,000) 
 Outram (642)

The electorate was abolished at the 2019/20 electoral redistribution, with the majority of the electorate being included in a recreated , although the Otago Peninsula was incorporated into the Dunedin electorate.

History
During the nine years of its first existence, the electorate was represented by two MPs, Henry Fish (1881–1884 and 1887–1890) and James Gore (1884–1887).

The first representative was James Arnold, who was an independent liberal and who served until the end of the parliamentary term in 1908, when he successfully contested Dunedin Central.

He represented the electorate for six parliamentary terms until 1928. In 1919, Tom Paul nearly won the seat for Labour, losing by only 84 votes.

At the next election in 1931, the electorate was won by Fred Jones of the Labour Party. Jones held the electorate until 1946, when it was abolished, and successfully stood in St Kilda that year.

Cullen had previously represented St Kilda (1981–1996). At the next election in 1999, Cullen stood as a list candidate only and was succeeded by David Benson-Pope as the electorate MP. After three parliamentary terms, Benson-Pope was not selected by the Labour Party as their candidate, but Clare Curran was chosen instead. Curran has represented the electorate since the 2008 election.

The city of Dunedin is a New Zealand Labour Party stronghold; The last National MP elected from a Dunedin constituency was Richard Walls in 1975. However, in 2011, National Party candidate, Jo Hayes, reduced the incumbent, Clare Curran's majority from 6449 in 2008 to 4175, and National gained a plurality of the party vote in Dunedin South by 1837 votes. The winning of the party vote was unprecedented in Dunedin South, which was seen, pre 2011, as a Labour Party stronghold. However the predecessor seat of St Kilda was represented by Jim Barnes of the National Party between 1951 and 1957.

In mid April 2020, it was announced that Dunedin South would be reconstituted as the  electorate. The Otago peninsula was transferred to the  electorate while the new Taieri electorate would include South Dunedin and South Otago, with the latter being transferred from the former  electorate.

Members of Parliament
Key

List MPs
Members of Parliament elected from party lists in elections where that person also unsuccessfully contested the Dunedin South electorate. Unless otherwise stated, all MPs' terms began and ended at general elections.

1Hayes was elected from the party list in January 2014 following the resignation of Katrina Shanks.

Election results

2017 election

2014 election

2011 election

Electorate (as at 26 November 2011): 45,818

2008 election

2005 election

2002 election

1999 election

1996 election

1943 election

1938 election

1935 election

1931 election

 
 
 
 
 
 
 

Table footnotes:

1928 election

Table footnotes

Notes

References

External links
Electorate Profile  Parliamentary Library

Historical electorates of New Zealand
Politics of Dunedin
1881 establishments in New Zealand
1905 establishments in New Zealand
1996 establishments in New Zealand
1890 disestablishments in New Zealand
1946 disestablishments in New Zealand